Shahrak-e Emam Khomeyni (also Romanized as Shahrak-e Emām Khomeynī; also known as Shahrak-e Mantaẓerīyeh) is a village in Ali Jamal Rural District, in the Central District of Boshruyeh County, South Khorasan Province, Iran. At the 2006 census, its population was 584, in 162 families.

References 

Populated places in Boshruyeh County